Symphodus doderleini is a species of wrasse native to the coasts of the Mediterranean Sea through the Sea of Marmara.

References

External links
 

doderleini
Fish described in 1890
Taxa named by David Starr Jordan